The McLaren MP4-17 was the car with which the McLaren team competed in the  and  Formula One World Championships. The chassis was designed by Adrian Newey, Mike Coughlan, Neil Oatley and Peter Prodromou with Mario Illien designing the bespoke Ilmor engine. The car was driven by Briton David Coulthard and Finn Kimi Räikkönen in both seasons.

2002 
The team did not perform as well as expected in 2002, in a season dominated by Ferrari, and due to the unreliability of the car; they eventually finished third in the Constructors' Championship with 65 points and one victory (in Monaco).

2003 
Using a development version of the car, the MP4-17D, the 2003 season started very promisingly with wins at the first two grands prix of the year, one each for Coulthard and Räikkönen. However, rival teams soon caught up as McLaren was sidetracked by the development of the McLaren MP4-18, a radical new design, which due to reliability problems, never raced in anger. As a result, the team gradually fell slightly further back as the season progressed, allowing rivals, developing their cars more efficiently, to catch up. However, despite this setback, Räikkönen consistently finished in the points and challenged Michael Schumacher for the championship all the way up to the last race, eventually losing the title by only 2 points. The team again finished third in the Constructors' Championship, and having 142 points, just two points behind Williams F1.

McLaren used 'West' logos, in both seasons except at the French and British Grands Prix.

Complete Formula One results
(key) (results in bold indicate pole position, results in italics indicate fastest lap)

References

McLaren MP4 17
2002 Formula One season cars
2003 Formula One season cars